East Providence is a city in Providence County, Rhode Island, United States. The population was 47,139 at the 2020 census, making it the fifth-largest city in the state.

Geography
East Providence is located between the Providence and Seekonk Rivers on the west and the Seekonk area of Massachusetts on the east.

The following villages are located in East Providence:
 East Providence Center
 Riverside
 Rumford

Governance

The City of East Providence is governed by an elected mayor and a five-member city council, with the mayor and counselors elected every four years. City council members are elected one each from four wards and one elected at-large.

Executive branch
The mayor is both the ceremonial leader of the city and the chief executive officer. The mayor runs the daily operations of the city, enforces the charter and ordinances of the city and appoints all department heads except the city clerk. The current mayor of East Providence is Roberto DaSilva, who took office on January 9, 2019.

Up until January 9, 2019, the day-to-day operations were managed by a professional city manager appointed by the city council, and the mayor was the president of the city council, acting ceremonially.

Legislative branch
The city council sets all city ordinances, sets the budget of the city (with recommendation from the mayor) and provides legislative oversight for city operations.

The city council elects a council president and council vice-president to preside over meetings. The city council also appoints the city clerk.

Up until 2019, The city council served two-year terms, and the city council oversaw the entire city government under a council-manager system.

, the members of the East Providence City Council are:
 Robert Rodericks—At-Large (council vice-president)
 Robert Britto—Ward 1 (council president)
 Anna Sousa—Ward 2
 Nathan Cahoon—Ward 3
 Ricardo Mourato—Ward 4

Judicial branch
The City of East Providence has a municipal court, which hears cases regarding violations of municipal ordinances, housing code violations and minor traffic violations. The city also has a probate court, which handles estates, name changes, guardianships and related matters. Judges for both courts are appointed by the mayor with confirmation by the city council for a term of two years.

Education governance
The city also has an elected school committee, elected for two-year terms by the same ward system as the city council. The school committee has broad authority to manage the school system, including setting all school system policies, setting the school system budget (within the general appropriation by the city, state and federal government) as well as selecting and overseeing the Superintendent of Schools.

Other boards and commissions
The city has an appointed library board of trustees which governs the city's library system and various other appointed governing and advisory boards and commissions.

Demographics

As of the census of 2000, there were 48,688 people, 20,530 households, and 12,851 families residing in the city. The racial makeup of the city was 86.49% White, 5.02% African American, 0.46% Native American, 1.15% Asian, 0.05% Pacific Islander, 2.80% from other races, and 4.03% from two or more races. Hispanic or Latino of any race were 1.89% of the population.

There were 20,530 households, out of which 27.1% had children under the age of 18 living with them, 46.3% were married couples living together, 12.7% had a female householder with no husband present, and 37.4% were non-families. 32.4% of all households were made up of individuals, and 14.6% had someone living alone who was 65 years of age or older. The average household size was 2.33 and the average family size was 2.99.

In the city, the population was spread out, with 21.7% under the age of 18, 7.4% from 18 to 24, 29.4% from 25 to 44, 22.6% from 45 to 64, and 18.9% who were 65 years of age or older. The median age was 40 years. For every 100 females, there were 86.8 males. For every 100 females age 18 and over, there were 82.6 males.

The median income for a household in the city was $39,108, and the median income for a family was $48,463. Males had a median income of $34,342 versus $26,423 for females. The per capita income for the city was $19,527. About 6.3% of families and 8.6% of the population were below the poverty line, including 10.7% of those under age 18 and 11.0% of those aged 65 or over.

The population has large immigrant communities from Portugal, the Azores, Madeira and Cape Verde.

Education
East Providence has 13 public and 5 non-public schools:

Public schools

Elementary 

 Agnes B. "Hennessey"
 Alice M. "Waddington" – built 1954
 Emma G. "Whiteknact"
 James R.D. "Oldham"
 Kent Heights
 Myron J. "Francis" - built 1989
 Orlo Avenue School
 Silver Spring

Middle schools 

 Edward R. Martin Middle School – built 1977
 Riverside Middle School

High school 

 Grove Ave. Educational Development Center
 East Providence High School – built 1952
 East Providence Career & Technical Center

Non-public elementary and junior-high schools 

 St. Mary "Bayview" Academy
 Sacred Heart School
 St. Margaret School
 The Gordon School
 Providence Country Day (P.C.D.).

Non-public high schools 

 St. Mary "Bayview" Academy
 Providence Country Day (P.C.D.).

Health and medicine

Bradley Hospital, the nation's first psychiatric facility exclusively for children, was founded in 1931. It is a teaching hospital for the Warren Alpert Medical School of Brown University.

National Register of Historic Places listings in East Providence

 Bicknell–Armington Lightning Splitter House
 Boston and Providence Railroad Bridge
 Bridgham Farm
 Carpenter, Lakeside, and Springvale Cemeteries
 Crescent Park Looff Carousel, (National Historic Landmark)
 Elm Tree Plat Historic District
 Nathaniel Daggett House
 James Dennis House
 District 6 Schoolhouse
 Little Neck Cemetery
 Newman Cemetery
 Newman Congregational Church
 Oddfellows' Hall
 Pomham Rocks Light
 Rose Land Park Plat Historic District
 Richmond Paper Company Mill Complex
 Rumford Chemical Works and Mill House Historic District
 Rumford Historic District
 Squantum Association
 St. Mary's Episcopal Church
 Phillip Walker House
 Whitcomb Farm
 World War I Memorial

Notable people

 Arunah Shepherdson Abell (1806–1888), philanthropist and newspaper publisher (Philadelphia Public Ledger and The Baltimore Sun); born in East Providence
 Ben Sears, baseball pitcher drafted by the Kansas City Royals; attended East Providence High School
 Rebecca DiPietro, model and WWE Diva; lives in East Providence
 John Michael Greer, author and former Archdruid; lives in East Providence
 Elisabeth Hasselbeck, TV personality on Fox & Friends and The View; attended and graduated from St. Mary Academy – Bay View in 1995
 Jimmy Hatlo, cartoonist, was born in East Providence
 Claudia Jordan, model and reality TV personality (Deal or No Deal, Celebrity Apprentice); Miss Rhode Island USA (1997); grew up in East Providence 
 Jennifer Lee, co-writer of screenplay for Wreck-It Ralph; writer of screenplay for and co-director of Frozen; born in East Providence
 Davey Lopes, second baseman and coach for several Major League Baseball teams; born in East Providence
 Jamie Silva, football safety for the Indianapolis Colts; born in East Providence
 Meredith Vieira, hostess of Millionaire, co-host of Today and The View; born in East Providence
 Ron Wilson, hockey defenseman and coach for the US Olympic hockey team and several National Hockey League teams; attended East Providence High School

See also

References

Further reading
 Our Heritage: A History of East Providence, Joseph Conforti

External links

 City of East Providence
 East Providence School Department
 East Providence Public Library
 East Providence Historical Society
 East Providence Arts Council 
Births Index  from the Rhode Island State Archives
Guide to the East Providence Public Library Genealogical and Reference Materials from the Rhode Island State Archives

 
1862 establishments in Rhode Island
Cape Verdean American history
Cities in Providence County, Rhode Island
Cities in Rhode Island
Populated places established in 1862
Portuguese-American culture in Rhode Island
Providence metropolitan area